Copelatus spangleri is a species of diving beetle. It is part of the subfamily Copelatinae in the family Dytiscidae. It was described by Vazirani in 1974.

References

spangleri
Beetles described in 1974